Snow Peak (also called Cleveland Rock) is a summit of the Oregon Cascades in Willamette National Forest.  It is located in an undeveloped area with only primitive road access.

Fire lookout 

A fire lookout was present on Snow Peak from August 1912—when a telephone line was installed.  A lookout house was built in 1923, and then rebuilt or expanded in 1929.  Newspapers and magazines were traditionally delivered to the fire lookout by pack burro, but on August 10, 1939, they were delivered by an accurate airdrop.  On the last day of a quiet fire season, September 16, 1948, the lookout itself caught on fire when the departing observer cleaned up and put last of the trash in the stove as he left.  The roof burned and fire's heat broke the windows.

Columbus Day Storm of October 1962 damaged the lookout which was repaired by building a new  structure which cost $3500 in 1965 (equivalent $ today.).  The structure lasted until April 1980 when the remains of the station were dismantled after persistent neglect and vandalism.

See also 
  is also a retailer of outdoor gear and accessories.  Founded in Japan in 1958, it expanded to the U.S. in 1999 through its flagship store in NW Portland and Soho, New York City.

References 

Cascade Range
Willamette National Forest
Geology of Oregon